Beechwood, West Virginia may refer to:

Beechwood, Wood County, West Virginia, an unincorporated community
Beechwood, Wyoming County, West Virginia, an unincorporated community